Sir Daniel Gooch, 1st Baronet (24 August 1816 – 15 October 1889) was an English railway locomotive and transatlantic cable engineer. He was the first Superintendent of Locomotive Engines on the Great Western Railway from 1837 to 1864 and its chairman from 1865 until his death in 1889.

Between 1865 and 1885 Gooch was Conservative MP for Cricklade.

Early life
Gooch was born in Bedlington, Northumberland, the son of John Gooch, an iron founder, and his wife, Anna Longridge. In 1831 his family moved to Tredegar Ironworks, Monmouthshire, South Wales, where his father had accepted a managerial post, and it was there that Daniel would begin training under Thomas Ellis senior, who together with Ironmaster Samuel Homfray and Richard Trevithick pioneered steam railway locomotion. Gooch wrote in his diaries "Large works of this kind are by far the best school for a young engineer to get a general knowledge of what he needs in after life." and "...I look back upon the time spent at Tredegar as by far the most important years of my life...".

He trained in engineering with a variety of companies, including a period with Robert Stephenson and Company, in Newcastle upon Tyne, as a draughtsman. At the age of 20 he was recruited by Isambard Kingdom Brunel for the Great Western Railway, under the title "Superintendent of Locomotive Engines", taking office on 18 August 1837.

While working in Newcastle he met his future wife, Margaret Tanner, the daughter of Henry Tanner, a Sunderland shipowner. He stayed in touch with Margaret when he moved south to work for Brunel.

Railway engineer
In Gooch's earliest days with the Great Western Railway, he struggled to keep the miscellaneous collection of  broad gauge steam locomotives previously ordered by Brunel in working order. When working at Robert Stephenson and Company, he had helped design two  gauge locomotives for the New Orleans Railway, which had never been delivered. Gooch persuaded Brunel to buy the two locomotives, North Star and Morning Star, and had Stephenson convert them to  gauge before delivery.  

As the only reliable locomotives that the company had at that time, they were the basis of the GWR Star Class. He and Brunel improved the blastpipe arrangement of the North Star to improve its fuel efficiency. Eventually Gooch moved on from the Star class and designed the new GWR Firefly Class of 2-2-2 express passenger locomotives, introduced in 1840. 

In comparative trials by the Gauge Commissioners, Ixion of this class proved capable of speeds greater than its  challenger. In 1843 Gooch introduced a new form of locomotive valve gear.

In 1840, Gooch was responsible for identifying the site of Swindon Works and in 1846 for designing the first complete locomotive to be constructed there, Great Western, prototype of the GWR Iron Duke Class of 4-2-2 locomotives, which were able to achieve . Much renewed, they lasted to the end of the GWR broad gauge era. 

Although Gooch's locomotives were principally for the broad gauge, between 1854 and 1864 he also had to design a number of standard gauge classes for the GWR's new Northern Division. In 1864, he resigned from his post of Locomotive Superintendent, though he continued as a member of the GWR Board.

Cable engineer and other roles
From 1859, Gooch lived at Clewer Park in Windsor and was a Deputy Lieutenant for Berkshire. 

In 1865, he was recalled to the Great Western Railway Company as chairman. He was also chief engineer of the Telegraph Construction and Maintenance Company. 

On completion of the cable, on 27 July 1866, Gooch, who was on the Great Eastern, sent a cable message to the Secretary of State for Foreign Affairs, Lord Stanley, saying "Perfect communication established between England and America; God grant it will be a lasting source of benefit to our country."

Political career
In 1865, while out of the country laying the cable, Gooch was elected Conservative MP for Cricklade. He held the seat until 1885. During his time as MP, he never addressed Parliament; he noted this in his diary when Parliament was dissolved on 18 November 1885 with the comment It would be a great advantage to business if there were a greater number who followed my example.

Later business activities
In 1866 Gooch was created a baronet in recognition of his cable work. 

In 1868, he became chairman of the Telegraph Construction & Maintenance Company after John Pender, the first chairman, resigned.  He led the Great Western Railway out of near-bankruptcy and took a particular interest in construction of the Severn Tunnel. Final abandonment of the broad gauge did not take place until after his death at the age of 73.

Family

Gooch married Margaret Tanner in 1838; they had six children. Following her death in 1868, he married Emily Burder in 1870; she died in 1901. 

His brothers, John, Thomas, and William, were also railway engineers.

Legacy

GWR Castle Class steam locomotive no. 5070 and British Rail Western Region class 47 diesel locomotive no. D1663 (later 47078, then 47628) were both named Sir Daniel Gooch. Continuing with this tradition, the present Great Western Railway company has named class 800 no. 800004 after Gooch; it runs on the line that Gooch helped to create.

A pub in Bayswater, London was named the Daniel Gooch; it closed in 2016. The Sir Daniel Arms, a Wetherspoons pub in Swindon, is also named after Gooch, as is Gooch Street in the same town, one of several streets built to house Great Western railway workers.

See also
GWR locomotives by Gooch
Daniel Gooch standard gauge locomotives
Gooch valve gear
Gooch Baronets of Clewer Park

References

Further reading
 
 
 
 
 

 
 
 (24 September 2004), Sir Daniel Gooch. Retrieved 9 February 2005.

External links 

 
 Gooch's letter proposing Swindon railway works - Gooch’s Historic letter to Brunel - A Piece of Paper That Changed A Town’s Destiny
 Photograph of Gooch taken in the 1860s. National Portrait Gallery.
 Portrait of Gooch. National Portrait Gallery, artist, Francis Grant, 1872.

1816 births
1889 deaths
Baronets in the Baronetage of the United Kingdom
Members of the Parliament of the United Kingdom for English constituencies
English railway mechanical engineers
Locomotive builders and designers
People from Bedlington
People from Windsor, Berkshire
British railway pioneers
Submarine communications cables
UK MPs 1865–1868
UK MPs 1868–1874
UK MPs 1874–1880
UK MPs 1880–1885
Great Western Railway people
Directors of the Great Western Railway
19th-century British engineers
Members of the Parliament of the United Kingdom for Cricklade
19th-century British businesspeople
Deputy Lieutenants of Wiltshire
English Freemasons